Altar Mountain is a prominent mountain over  high, standing at the south end of Arena Valley in Victoria Land, Antarctica. Indicated but not named on Ferrar's 1907 map. So named by the New Zealand Geological Survey Antarctic Expedition (1958–59) because of its stepped profile and flat top, similar to pyramids of the Aztec and Mayan civilizations.

See also
 Aztec Mountain
 Maya Mountain

References
 

Mountains of Victoria Land
Scott Coast